Songzi is a city in the southwest of Hubei province, People's Republic of China, located in the middle reach and southern bank of the Yangtze River. It is a county-level city under the administration of the prefecture-level city of Jingzhou, and controls 16 townships and 2 development zones, 235,000 households and a population of 765,911 (data from the 2010 Census). It is a long-historied but young and robust city.

Administrative divisions
Fourteen towns:
Xinjiangkou, Nanhai, Babao, Yuanshi, Laocheng, Chendian, Wangjiaqiao, Sijiachang, Yanglinshi, Zhichanghe, Jieheshi, Weishui, Liujiachang, Shadaoguan

Two townships:
Wanjia Township, Xiejiaping Tujia Ethnic Township

Geography

Songzi is conjoining with Jianghan Plain in the east {neighbouring with Jingzhou, Gong'an, adjoining with Yichang in the west {connecting to Wufeng and Yidu, bordering with Wuling in the south (adjacent to Li County, Shimen in Hunan province), and being bounded by Yangtse River in the north, looking across the river to Zhicheng. Situated in the crossing point between Jiaoliu Railway and Yangtze River, it is a newly flourishing city prospering from industry, agriculture, commerce and trade, tourism, etc.

Songzi has a long and splendor history, as far as back to Palaeolithic Period (the Old Stone Age) when the primitive human beings had already settled down here. Awaking from Spring and Autumn Period, continuing into two Han Dynasties, bustling at Wei and Jin Dynasties, thriving at Ming and Qing Dynasties, now it is prospering at the time of Reforming and Opening Period in contemporary China.

Songzi has excellent natural conditions – fertile land, rich resources, mild climate, and moderate rainfall. It has beautiful mountains and rivers, with quite versatile landscapes. There are mountains, hills, uplands, plains linking to each other - “six-tenths of hills, one-tenth of waters and three-tenths of farmland”. The climate is a subtropical transitional monsoon one. The non-frost period is about 232~301 days in a year. The annual average hours of sunshine is 1,600~1,900H.

Climate

Economy
It is very suitable for agricultural development. It already has the famous brands like Weishui siniperca shuatsi, Mashui sweet pomelo, Shangming-brand mandarin orange, Babao cotton, etc. The total products of cotton, animal husbandry (pork, beef, mutton) make Songzi to have entered into the rank of Top 100 counties and cities in its kind in China. The city has been named by the State as the produce base for marketable grains, high-quality cotton, Changjiang-River-Upper-and-Middle-Stream Fruit Development.

It is rich in natural resources. The exploitable ones include crude oil, coal, halite (rock salt), canbyite, barytes, limestone, and others, 22 kinds in total. It has become the important coal and cement output area in Hubei Province.

It has a relatively good industry foundation and now primarily with a framework of 10 industries - mining, metallurgy, glass and ceramics, textile, electric lighting, brewery, chemical engineering, machinery, building materials, paper-making. It is a light industry base in Hubei Province.

The well-known Hubei winery "Baiyunbian" ("") is a key enterprise in Songzi. Baiyunbian Liquor is a representative of mix-flavored Chinese liquors, with its aroma close to that of "Maotai".

Tourism
Songzi’s tourism is also richly endowed by nature. There is the state-level scenic spot – Weishui Resort, which integrates the mountains, waters, caves, forests, springs into one natural wonder. It provides the multi-functions for tourism, adventure, scientific exploration, summer resort, and sanatorium. It is located within the Golden Triangle for Tourism among the Three Gorges of the Yangtse River, Jingzhou Ancient City, and Zhangjiajie Scenic Area.

Weishui Resort is made up of three parts - Weishui Reservoir, Weishui National Forest Park and Cluster of Karst Caves and Hot Springs. The Resort presents to tourists the tenderness and gentleness of Southern China’s mountains and waters as well as the majesty and grandeur of Northern China’s scenery and beauty.

Weishui Lake is called as “Fairyland in the Southern Chu”. Meandering through the green hills and blue waters, Weishui Waterdam has a total length of 8969m and is said to be the longest earth-filled man-made dam in Asia. Dotted on the clear blue water are innumerable islets covered by green trees and bushes. Surrounding the lake are dark green hills stretching far into distance and disappearing into Wuling Mountains. “Mountains go alive with water, water becomes enchanting with mountains”. Under the blue sky and white clouds, with the hordes of white cranes flying from the woods to the water while the fish popping out their heads occasionally for making a scene of bustle and excitement, Weishui Lake and National Forest Park form a beautiful country scene, like a traditional Chinese ink and wash.

Besides Weishui Lake there is a Buddhist Temple famous in Southern Chu (“”) – Lingjiu Si, whose history can be dated back to Jin Dynasty.

Taking the boat and sailing to northwest about 20 kilometers and arriving to the other end of Weishui Lake, you climb to a mountain very close to the lake and then you find the ancient caves which can bring you back to the early stages in the Earth’s life.

Have come into being at Cambrian system about 500 million years ago, with its “one superb, three wonders, ten focal points” and close to one hundred geological scenic spots, the New God Cave incorporates the charm, danger, queerness, rareness and magnificence altogether. In view of the complex geological structures, the continuous geological strata, the clear topographic features, the area where the Cave locates have been picked up as “the teaching and practicing base for Science of the Earth” by Changjiang University.

The underground stream flows through the cave and a 10-meter-high waterfall is formed near the entry of the cave. Inside the cave, there are many stalactites and stalagmites in various shapes – like stone curtain, stone column, stone shoot, stone flowers, etc. There is also a swarm of miraculous rimstone dams which have been developed with the underground river by hundreds of millions of years – one is three-staged and the height of the top stage reaches 4 meters, at least 1.5 meters higher than other known ones in China. At one of the very inner corner, there is even a huge Performing Stage with a very rare background of a 16 meters x 7 meters stone curtain hanging, which comprises 262 pleats.

There are rich living things resources - more than 1,000 different kinds of plants and more than 20 kinds of wild beast animals and close to 40 kinds of birds and numerous amphibious animals, reptiles, insects and fishes. Even there were reports of sighting Southern China Tiger, Leopard (panthera pardus), White Swans and other rare animals in the forest.

History

In ancient time, Songzi was under the administration of Jingzhou, which belonged to the state of Chu in the Warring States Period and Nanjun in the Qin dynasty.

In Gaozu Year 5 (BC 202) of the Han dynasty, a county administration was established here, named Gaocheng.

In Jianwu Year 6 (AD 30) of the Eastern Han dynasty, Gaocheng county was dissolved and merged into Chanling (modern day Gong'an County).

In Three Kingdom Period, it belonged to Wu State, under the administration of Chanling, but with a Lexiang Magistrate being appointed to rule the area.

Till the Xiankang Year 3 (AD 337) of Eastern Jin dynasty, the refugees, who emigrated from the then Songzi of Lujiangjun (modern-day Huoqiu County, Anhui) to flee from the disorder by the wars, settled down and established here the Songzi county.

From then on the name of the county continued down to the present days, lasting for more than 1,600 years.

In December, 1995, the county administration was lifted to a city level. The city seat is Xinjiangkou Town since September 1945.

Infrastructures

Songzi has the convenient transportation system with complete and good infrastructures. The whole city is crisscrossed with a network of high-grade roads. Jiao-Liu Railway runs across the city, with two level-3 railway stations. Along the main passage of Changjiang River, there are 3 thousand-ton berths, 1 mechanized dock.

There is the ample electricity supply. It has one coal power plant, 4 hydro-power stations and also the transformation substations with the power supply from Three-Gorge Hydro-Power Stations.

Demographics

The following nationalities are represented: Han, Hui, Manchu, Tujia, Miao, Mongols.

References

Cities in Hubei
County-level divisions of Hubei
Jingzhou